Sandro França Varejão (born April 9, 1972) is a Brazilian former professional basketball player. A 6'11" (2.10 m) center, he is the older brother of Anderson Varejão and played college basketball in the United States from 1993 to 1997, initially with Southern Idaho in the NJCAA and then with West Virginia in the NCAA Division I. After going undrafted in the 1997 NBA Draft he started his professional career in Brazil, where he won several titles, among them 4 national championships and a Liga Sudamericana. He is a 6-time medalist with the Brazilian national team and participated in two FIBA World Championships in 1998 and 2002.

College career
Born in Vitória, in the Espírito Santo state of Brazil, Varejão played basketball in high school at Colégio Salesiano Nossa Senhora da Vitória, where he also played volleyball: he won a volleyball national title during his last year of high school. In 1991 he moved to the United States, and joined the College of Southern Idaho Golden Eagles, playing in the NJCAA. In his first season with the team he averaged 8.3 points, 5.1 rebounds and 1.4 blocks per game, and was named in the All-Region 18 Second Team. In his sophomore year at Southern Idaho he improved his averages to 17.8 points and 11 rebounds, and after the 1994–95 season he decided to transfer to West Virginia, in the NCAA Division I.

In his first year with the Mountaineers Varejão wore jersey number 40. He started all of his 27 games, averaging 6.5 points and 3.7 rebounds and 0.03 blocks in 23 minutes per game. He recorded a career-high 18 points (and added 10 rebounds) against Ohio on December 16, 1995. Varejão was 7th in the team in scoring and 3rd in rebounding. In his senior year of college he started 17 of 29 games, averaging 6.1 points, 4.7 rebounds and 0.3 blocks in 20.2 minutes per game; he recorded a season-high 14 points against Providence on February 8, 1997. At the end of the season he ranked 7th in the team in scoring and 3rd in rebounding (behind Gordon Malone and Damian Owens). He ended his career at West Virginia with totals of 353 points and 234 rebounds.

College statistics

|-
| align="left" | 1995–96
| align="left" | West Virginia
| 27 || 27 || 23.0 || .511 || .000 || .493 || 3.7 || 0.6 || 0.5 || 0.3 || 6.5
|-
| align="left" | 1996–97
| align="left" | West Virginia
| 29 || 17 || 20.2 || .514 || .000 || .545 || 4.7 || 0.8 || 0.5 || 0.3 || 6.1
|-
| align="left" | Career
| align="left" |
| 56 || 44 || 21.6 || .513 || .000 || .515 || 4.2 || 0.7 || 0.5 || 0.3 || 6.3
|-

Professional career
After his senior year in college Varejão was automatically eligible for the NBA draft: during the 1997 draft he was not selected by an NBA franchise. He then moved back to his native Brazil and started a professional career: in 1998 he joined Franca, and he was selected as an All-Star in 1999 and played the All-Star Game in Mogi das Cruzes in March 1999. For the 1999 season he averaged 16.6 points, 6.4 rebounds and 0.7 assists over 37 games while shooting 62.3% from the field. In the final game of the title series of the 1999 Brazilian Championship against Vasco da Gama, Varejão scored 14 points and recorded 2 rebounds in 31 minutes of play, winning the game and the national title.

He then joined Vasco da Gama for the 1999 McDonald's Championship, reaching the tournament finals where they lost to the San Antonio Spurs. He was then part of the Vasco team that won the Campeonato Carioca, the Brazilian league and the Liga Sudamericana in 2000. In 2001 he won the Brazilian league (his third consecutive title) and the Carioca league with Vasco. He then played the 2002–03 season with Universo/Ajax, a team based in Goiânia, reaching the league semifinals where they were eliminated by Unitri/Uberlândia. He then played for Brasília in 2003 before going back to Universo/Ajax for the 2004 season. In 2004 Universo/Ajax again reached the league semifinals, and they were eliminated by Flamengo.

In 2004 he joined Telemar Rio de Janeiro, and in 2005 he won the national league title (his 4th personal), beating Unitri/Uberlândia in the finals. He then played the 2006–07 season with Saldanha da Gama.

National team career
Varejão was first called up to the Brazilian national team in 1997, and in the 1997 Tournament of the Americas he won the bronze medal. In 1998 he participated in the 1998 FIBA World Championship, averaging 2.9 points and 2.9 rebounds per game over 7 appearances. In 1999 he won two gold medals, one in the FIBA South American Championship and one in the Pan American Games. In 2001 he took part in the South American Championship, winning the silver medal, and in the 2001 Tournament of the Americas, where he also won silver. He won the bronze at the 2001 Goodwill Games, his third medal of the year. In 2002 he played in the 2002 FIBA World Championship, averaging 7.3 points and 4.8 rebounds over 9 games played.

References

External links
Career stats at ProBallers.com
College stats at Sports-Reference.com
Stats at FIBA.com

1972 births
Living people
1998 FIBA World Championship players
2002 FIBA World Championship players
Basketball players at the 1999 Pan American Games
Brazilian expatriate basketball people in the United States
Brazilian men's basketball players
Centers (basketball)
CR Vasco da Gama basketball players
Franca Basquetebol Clube players
Novo Basquete Brasil players
Pan American Games gold medalists for Brazil
Pan American Games medalists in basketball
Southern Idaho Golden Eagles men's basketball players
West Virginia Mountaineers men's basketball players
Goodwill Games medalists in basketball
Competitors at the 2001 Goodwill Games
Medalists at the 1999 Pan American Games
People from Mogi das Cruzes
Sportspeople from São Paulo (state)